Hyptiharpa is a genus of moths belonging to the family Tortricidae.

Species
Hyptiharpa hypostas Razowski, 1992

See also
List of Tortricidae genera

References

 , 2005, World Catalogue of Insects 5

External links

tortricidae.com

Euliini
Tortricidae genera